La cathédrale is French for "The Cathedral", and may refer to:
 La Cathédrale (film)
 La Cathedrale (Stradivarius violin)
 The Cathedral (Huysmans novel), originally La Cathédrale in French
 Cathedral of Our Lady of the Angels

See also 
 Cathedral (disambiguation)
 La cathédrale engloutie